Rhabdoblennius rhabdotrachelus, the barchin blenny, is a species of combtooth blenny found in the Pacific ocean.  This species reaches a length of  SL.

References

rhabdotrachelus
Taxa named by Henry Weed Fowler 
Taxa named by Stanley Crittenden Ball
Fish described in 1924